Grocery Outlet Holding Corp. is an American discount closeout retailer consisting exclusively of supermarket locations that offer deeply discounted, overstocked, and closeout products from name brand and private label suppliers. The company has stores in California, Oregon, Washington, Idaho, Nevada, Pennsylvania and New Jersey.

The majority of Grocery Outlet's stores are independently operated by locally based, married couples. Each store has flexibility in its product offerings to serve local tastes and demand. The Read family founded the company in 1946. The formal name is Grocery Outlet Bargain Market.

History 

James Read founded the company on June 11, 1946, in San Francisco, California. He bought government surplus food products and sold them in previously vacant stores throughout San Francisco. He named his new company Cannery Sales. In 1970, Cannery Sales acquired Globe of California and renamed it Canned Foods. Canned Foods changed to selling closeout, factory second, and discounted products. In 1971 Canned Foods signed its first agreement with a supplier, Del Monte Foods. It later signed agreements with companies such as ConAgra, the Quaker Oats Company, and Revlon. Canned Foods opened its first independent store in Redmond, Oregon, in 1973.

Following founder James Read's death in 1982, his sons Steven and Peter took over company management. In 1987, the company was renamed Grocery Outlet. Grocery Outlet's 100th store opened in 1995.

In 2001, Grocery Outlet acquired all remaining liquidated inventories of Webvan following the online grocery delivery service's bankruptcy. During the same year, Grocery Outlet acquired online retailer Wine.com's remaining inventory following that retailer's bankruptcy. In 2002, the company changed its corporate name to Grocery Outlet, Inc.

Grocery Outlet purchased 16 Yes!Less grocery stores in Texas and another in Shreveport, Louisiana, from Dallas, Texas-based Fleming Cos. in January 2003. All 17 stores were closed by May 2004.

The company promoted MacGregor Read and Eric Lindberg to co-CEO in 2006. Prior to their appointment, Read was vice president of real estate and Lindberg vice president of purchasing for the company. They took over for Steven Read, who became executive chairman of Grocery Outlet. MacGregor Read is the son of Steven Read and Lindberg the son-in-law of Grocery Outlet Chairman Peter Read. MacGregor Read is the third generation of the Read family to serve as CEO of Grocery Outlet.

In 2007, the United States Court of Appeals for the Ninth Circuit awarded Albertsons an injunction against Grocery Outlet over its use of the Lucky brand name in a Rocklin, California, store. In 2009, the company added "Bargain Market" to its store branding.
In 2011, Grocery Outlet acquired the Pennsylvania-based chain Amelia's Grocery Outlet.

In 2009, Berkshire Partners became an investor in Grocery Outlet. In 2014, private equity fund Hellman & Friedman LLC agreed to partner with senior management and acquire Grocery Outlet from principal owner Berkshire Partners LLC.

In December 2018, the Board of Directors appointed Eric Lindberg to Chief Executive Officer and MacGregor Read to Vice Chairman.

In June 2019, Grocery Outlet went public, shares of Grocery Outlet's common stock began trading on Nasdaq Global Select Market on June 20, 2019, under the symbol “GO.”

Products 
Inventory comes primarily from overstocks and closeouts of name-brand groceries, as well as private-label groceries. Grocery Outlet buys mostly closeout or seasonal merchandise, so particular brand names change often. The company's stores also carry food staples such as fresh meat, dairy and bread. All products sold by Grocery Outlet are purchased directly from manufacturers, never from other retail stores. One of the most popular sections in Grocery Outlet is labeled NOSH (natural, organic, specialty and healthy). Mainly because of this section, Grocery Outlet has attracted followers who want to buy ethical items (often vegan and/or plant-based) on a budget.

References

External links 

 

1946 establishments in California
American companies established in 1946
Companies based in Emeryville, California
Food and drink in the San Francisco Bay Area
Companies listed on the Nasdaq
Retail companies established in 1946
Supermarkets based in California
Supermarkets of the United States
2019 initial public offerings
2014 mergers and acquisitions